People of Hälsingland (Swedish: Hälsingar) is a 1933 Swedish drama film directed by Ivar Johansson and starring Hilda Castegren, Sven Bergvall and Sten Lindgren. It was shot at the Råsunda Studios in Stockholm. The film's sets were designed by the art director Arne Åkermark. It was remade as the 1940 Finnish film In the Fields of Dreams.

Cast
 Hilda Castegren as 	Mother Övergård
 Sven Bergvall as Olof
 Sten Lindgren as 	Jonas
 Inga Tidblad as 	Birgit Ljusnar
 Frank Sundström as 	Gudmund
 Henning Ohlsson as 	Per-Erik
 Karin Ekelund as 	Lisa-Lena
 Edit Ernholm as 	Brita
 Kaj Aspegren as 	Maja-Stina
 Emmy Albiin as 	Gammel-Kersti 
 Hugo Björne as Komministern i Dalbo 
 Tor Borong as 	Gammel-August 
 Carl Deurell as 	Fängelsedirektören 
 John Elfström as 	Dräng i slagsmål 
 Gösta Ericsson as 	Niko 
 Knut Frankman as 	Karlsson 
 Karin Granberg as 	Kvinna på dansbanan 
 Carl Harald as 	Vaktmästare 
 Bror Olsson as 	Domaren i tingsrätten 
 Aurore Palmgren as Åhörare i tingssalen 
 Hjalmar Peters as Patron på Näsvik 
 Albert Ståhl as 	Kamrer 
 Hugo Tranberg as 	Åklagare

References

Bibliography 
 Qvist, Per Olov & von Bagh, Peter. Guide to the Cinema of Sweden and Finland. Greenwood Publishing Group, 2000.
 Sundholm, John. Historical Dictionary of Scandinavian Cinema. Scarecrow Press, 2012.

External links 
 

1933 films
Swedish drama films
1933 drama films
1930s Swedish-language films
Films directed by Ivar Johansson
Swedish black-and-white films
1930s Swedish films